Araskonay, also rendered as Arazguni or Arsagona or Arasgona, may refer to:
 Araskonay-e Olya
 Araskonay-e Sofla